HMS Monarch was the first seagoing British warship to carry her guns in turrets, and the first British warship to carry guns of  calibre.

Design 

She was designed by Sir Edward Reed, at a time when the basic configuration of battleship design was undergoing major change simultaneously in many aspects. Sail was gradually giving way to steam, wooden hulls had just been superseded by iron, smoothbore artillery firing round-shot had been overtaken by rifled shell-firing cannon, increasingly heavier armour was being mounted, and there was mounting agitation in naval design circles to abandon broadside armament in favour of that mounted in turrets. In this melting-pot, any battleship design was fated to be a compromise, and the design of Monarch proved to be so.

Having determined that Monarch would carry her main artillery in turrets, the Board of Admiralty then stipulated that, as she was destined for overseas service, and steam engines were not at that time wholly reliable, she must carry a full ship-rig and be fitted with a forecastle. Reed objected to this concept, which had the effect of totally preventing the main artillery from firing on any other angle than on the port and starboard beams. He was overruled, and is reported to have taken little pride in the resulting ship. He himself wrote, in 1869 "no satisfactorily designed turret ship has yet been built, or even laid down.....the middle of the upper deck of a full-rigged ship is not a very eligible place for fighting large guns". In 1871 Reed stated to the Committee on Designs that he wanted on a turret ship no poop and no forecastle, and masts carrying at most light rig fore or aft on the centre-line which the guns could fire past.

In 1878, she underwent a refit by Messrs. Humphrys, Tennant & Co, Deptford. On 29 April, whilst undergoing sea trials, she ran aground off Sheerness, Kent avoiding a collision with a schooner. She was refloated two hours later.

Modernisation 
In 1890 she was selected for what was at the time called "modernisation". She was given new triple expansion engines and new boilers, and thereafter could make  – less than a knot better than on her first trials. No attempt was made to bring her armament up to date, although the muzzle-loading rifles which she carried were by then totally obsolete, and the fitting of breech-loading cannon would not have been difficult. At this time she received four 12-pounder  and ten 3-pounder quick-firers as a torpedo-boat defence.

Armament 
The four 12-inch muzzle-loading rifles carried as main armament were housed in two pairs in two centre-line turrets on the upper deck, one on either side of the funnel. Being situated on the upper deck, at a height of seventeen feet above water, they were seven feet higher than any battery in the fleet, with significant advantage thereby accruing in terms of range and command. Unlike earlier turret-equipped coast-defence ships, training was by steam power.

A good gun crew could fire an aimed shell every two minutes.

To compensate for the inability of the main guns to train either fore or after, two smaller guns of 7 inch calibre were carried in the bow, and one in the stern.

Service history 

HMS Monarch in Number 10 Dock, Portsmouth Dockyard, Hampshire; In 1871 census on 2 April; 316 on board; 209 not on board; Capt Charles Murray-Aynsley; (1821-1901) Captain of Monarch, Channel Squadron (until paying off); October 1870 to 29 November 1871 

She was commissioned for the Channel Fleet at Chatham, and served therein until 1872. During the service she crossed the Atlantic in the company of  carrying the remains of George Peabody, American merchant, financier and philanthropist, to the United States for burial. She paid off for refit, rejoining the Channel Fleet in 1874. Both vessels were severely damaged; they put in to Plymouth. In 1876  she was posted to the Mediterranean, where she served until 1885, with a short refit at home in 1877. She was present and active at the bombardment of Alexandria in 1882 under command of Captain H Fairfax, firing 125  shells at the Egyptian forts.

She was ordered to Malta in the Russian war scare of 1885, but broke down en route and her whereabouts were unknown for some days; she was ultimately found, towed into Malta, patched up and sent home under escort. After refit she again served in the Channel between 1885 and 1890. She spent the years from 1890 to 1897 undergoing a lengthy modernisation, after which she was guardship at Simon's Bay until late 1902. Captain Charles Henry Bayly was appointed in command on 1 February 1900. In March 1902 Captain Robert Kyle McAlpine was appointed in command, for service as Naval Officer in Charge Ascension. Two months later, Captain William Lowther Grant was appointed in command on 5 May 1902, and in July 1902 she was part of a group of seven Royal Navy ships visiting Zanzibar for a show of force following the death of the sultan and accession of his son. By December 1902 she was stationed at Simon's Town, the Royal Navy base outside Cape Town. She was thereafter reduced to the status of a depot ship outside Cape Town, under the new name of HMS Simoom; brought home in 1904, she was sold in 1905.

Gunnery trials 
A trial was undertaken in 1870 to compare the accuracy and rate of fire of turret-mounted heavy guns with those in a centre-battery ship. Each ship fired for five minutes, with the guns starting "loaded and very carefully trained". Three out of the Captain's four hits were achieved with the first salvo; firing this salvo caused the ship to roll heavily (±20°); smoke from firing made aiming difficult. The Monarch and the Hercules also did better with their first salvo, were inconvenienced by the smoke of firing, and to a lesser extent were caused to roll by firing. On the Hercules the gunsights were on the guns, and this worked better than the turret roof gunsights used by the other ships.

References

Publications
 
 Parkes, Oscar (1990) British Battleships: "Warrior", 1860, to "Vanguard", 1950: A History of Design, Construction, and Armament, New and rev. ed., London: Cooper, 
 Chesneau, Roger and Kolesnik, Eugene M. (1979) Conway's All the World's Fighting Ships 1860–1905, London: Conway Maritime Press, 
 Archibald, E.H.H.; Ray Woodward (ill.) (1971). The Metal Fighting Ship in the Royal Navy 1860–1970. New York: Arco Publishing Co. .

 

Battleships of the Royal Navy
Ships built in Chatham
1868 ships
Victorian-era battleships of the United Kingdom
Maritime incidents in November 1875
Maritime incidents in April 1878
Maritime incidents in December 1886